"The Lady from the Sea" is a 1953 episode of Sunday Night Theatre that is significant as one of the earliest extant examples of British television drama, along with an earlier episode of the series titled "It is Midnight, Doctor Schweitzer" and the first two episodes of The Quatermass Experiment. An adaptation of the 1888 play by Norwegian playwright Henrik Ibsen, it was performed twice, first on 10 May 1953 and again on the 14th. One of these live transmissions was recorded using the then-experimental telerecording process.

Cast
 Irene Worth as	Ellida	
 Robert Harris as Wangel
 Hamlyn Benson as Ballested
 Eric Berry as Arnholm
 Douglas Campbell as The Stranger
 Paul Harding as Lyngstrand (as Brian Harding)
 Sarah Lawson as Bolette
 Jane Wenham as Hilda

Reception
John Wyver, reviewing the programme in 2011, said "even nearly sixty years on, few allowances have to be made for it to be enjoyed as small-screen drama of the first order" and "Irene Worth demands attention and captures the eye in just the way that I recall Vanessa Redgrave doing at the Roundhouse"

References

External links
 

British television plays
Films based on works by Henrik Ibsen
1953 television plays
Sunday Night Theatre